Alicedale is a small settlement in Sarah Baartman District Municipality in the Eastern Cape province of South Africa, situated on the banks of the Bushmans River.

Railway History 

Alicedale is a railway junction on the main railway line between Johannesburg and Port Elizabeth. From here a branch line leads to Grahamstown.  The town was a railway training facility during the previous two centuries, from there the historical red facebrick building that now houses the reception of the resort hotel. The town was named for Mrs. Alice Slessor, the wife of the engineer in charge of construction of the railways.

Buildings of interest 

 Bushmans River Sands Hotel in Alicedale has an 18-hole golf course.
 St Barnabas Anglican Church was dedicated in 1887 and regular Anglican worship still takes place in the church.

Notes and references 

Populated places in the Makana Local Municipality